Christopher II, was the Catholicos of Armenia from 628 through 630. According to the historian Sebeos: 'he proved to be an arrogant and impious man whose tongue was as sharp as a sword'. Due to this, accusations were brought against him and the bishops and princes of the land were assembled to undertake an investigation. Two men from Christopher's family came to the trial and testified against him, as he had caused strife amongst his brothers as well. He was found guilty and he was defrocked from the priesthood and removed from the patriarchal throne. Ezra from the district of Nig was quickly enthroned to replace him, who was said to have been a humble man, much the opposite of Christopher.

Catholicoi of Armenia
7th-century Oriental Orthodox archbishops